The  is a multi-purpose dam on the Kawauchi River, a tributary stream of the Sakawa River in the town of Yamakita, Ashigarakami District, Kanagawa Prefecture on the island of Honshū, Japan. The dam is located within the borders of the Tanzawa-Ōyama Quasi-National Park.

History
Development of the Sakawa River began in the 1960s, as a public works project to promote the local economies of towns in western Kanagawa prefecture. Justification was provided by the projected growth in population of Odawara with the completion of the Tōkaidō Main Line railway and Tōmei Expressway and the continuing growth in demand from the Kawasaki-Yokohama industrial area for drinking and industrial water.

Work on the Miho Dam began in 1969 by the Kumagai Gumi construction company; and was completed in 1978. Construction involved the relocation of 233 households from the area scheduled to be flooded by the dam. Part of the relocation agreement included a promise to retain historic local place names, which resulted in the name of the dam being changed from the planned "Sakawa Dam" to "Miho Dam" in reflection of the local district name.

Design

The Miho Dam a rock-fill dam, with an initial design height of 100 meters, which was later lowered to 95 meters. Unusual for a rock-fill dam, the center portion of the dam is made of concrete and incorporates five spillways. The associated Tanoiri Hydroelectric Power Plant has a rated capacity of 7,400 KW of power. The reservoir created by the dam, Lake Tanzawa is also a major recreational location for Kanagawa Prefecture.

See also
Lake Tanzawa

References
Japan Commission on Large Dams. Dams in Japan:Past, Present and Future. CRC Press (2009). 
Takeuchi, Kuniyoshi. Sustainable Reservoir Development and Management. IAHS Press (November 1998).

External links

photo page
official home page (Japanese)

Rock-filled dams
Dams in Kanagawa Prefecture
Hydroelectric power stations in Japan
Dams completed in 1978